Gaunt may refer to:

Places 
 Ghent, Belgium was formerly called Gaunt

People with the name Gaunt 
David Gaunt (b. 1944), British historian
 Elizabeth Gaunt (d. 1685), convicted traitor
 Ernest Gaunt (1865–1940), British admiral, born in Australia
George W. F. Gaunt (1865–1918), President of the New Jersey State Senate
 Guy Gaunt (1870–1953), British admiral, brother of Ernest
 John of Gaunt (1340–1399), English prince
 Jon Gaunt (born 1961), British radio presenter and newspaper columnist, late 20th and early 21st century
 Maurice de Gaunt (fl. 1225), founder of Beverston Castle
 Nathan Gaunt (living), an Australian singer-songwriter
 Thomas Gaunt (1829–1890), jeweller and clockmaker of Melbourne, Australia

Fictional characters 
 Gaunt is a playable character from the video game Quake III Arenas expansion pack Quake 3 Team Arena
 Leland Gaunt, the antagonist in the Stephen King novel, Needful Things
 The House of Gaunt, a wizard family in the Harry Potter book series
 Nightgaunt, a fictional race created by H. P. Lovecraft
 In Warhammer 40,000:
 The Gaunt's Ghosts book series
 Ibram Gaunt, an Imperial Guard officer and main character of the above series
 Gaunt's Ghosts, the colloquial name for the Tanith First-and-Only regiment
 Gaunt, two Tyranid units: Termagaunts and Hormagaunts
 Edward Gaunt, a character from Robert Holdstock's book, Lavondyss
 John Gaunt, eponymous protagonist of Grimjack
 A pseudonym of Spider-Man villain Mendel Stromm

Other 
Gaunt, 1931 film with Ralph Lewis
 Gaunt's formula, a mathematical formula dealing with associated Legendre polynomials
 Gaunt (band), a punk rock band from Columbus, Ohio
 Emaciated